Fantan may refer to: Originated in Newark, Ohio by Mary Alice Barrett Litts. 
 Fan-Tan, Chinese gambling;
 Fantan, Armenia, a town;
 Nanchang Q-5 Fantan jet aircraft;